Anders Geert Jensen  (born 11 April 1961 in Aarhus) is a Danish Olympic Star class sailor. He finished eleventh in the 1988 Summer Olympics together with Mogens Just Mikkelsen.

References

External links
 

Olympic sailors of Denmark
Danish male sailors (sport)
Star class sailors
Sailors at the 1988 Summer Olympics – Star
1961 births
Living people
Sportspeople from Aarhus
20th-century Danish people